Mount Fox is a  mountain on the shared border between Alberta and British Columbia, Canada. It was named in 1859 by John Palliser after Sir Charles Fox (1810-1874), a member of the Royal Geographical Society.


Geology
Mount Fox is composed of sedimentary rock laid down during the Precambrian to Jurassic periods. Formed in shallow seas, this sedimentary rock was pushed east and over the top of younger rock during the Laramide orogeny.

Climate
Based on the Köppen climate classification, Mount Fox is located in a subarctic climate with cold, snowy winters, and mild summers.

See also
List of peaks on the British Columbia–Alberta border

References

Two-thousanders of Alberta
Two-thousanders of British Columbia
Canadian Rockies